Cyclopsis is a monospecific genus of marine ray-finned fish belonging to the family Cyclopteridae, the lumpfishes or lumpsuckers.

Cyclopsis was first proposed as a genus in 1930 by the Russian ichthyologist Alexander Mikhailovich Popov when he formally described Cyclopsis tentacularis.

References

Cyclopteridae
Monotypic fish genera
Fish described in 1930